Slough is a town in Berkshire, England.

Slough or sluff (alternate spelling) may also refer to:

People
 Alan Slough (1947–2021), English footballer
 John P. Slough (1829–1867), American politician and general

Places
 Borough of Slough, a unitary district of Berkshire, England
 Slough railway station, Berkshire, England
 Slough (UK Parliament constituency), House of Commons constituency for the Borough of Slough
 Slough Stadium, Berkshire, England
 Slough, Powys, a location in Wales

Games and sports
 Slough, a term in water polo
 Slough/sluff, a term in the card game Spades (card game)
 Slough, a term in card game Ruff

Other uses 
 Slough (hydrology), a wetland, often a backwater to a larger body of water
 "Slough" (poem), a 1937 poem by Sir John Betjeman
 Slough, the result of sloughing, shedding or casting off dead tissue
 Sluff, a nickname of the 166th Air Refueling Squadron
 Sluff, a minor avalanche, sometimes triggered in snow sports such as skiing or snowboarding
 SLUFF, a 2018 album by U.S. rock band Naked Giants

See also
 Sloughi, a breed of dog
 Slew (disambiguation)
 Sloughing (disambiguation)